The 1953 Invercargill mayoral election was part of the New Zealand local elections held that same year. The polling was conducted using the standard first-past-the-post electoral method.

Background
A major talking point in the lead-up to the election was the potential of a clash with the 1953 Royal Tour. There were proposals to postpone local elections until early 1954 over fears of reduced turnout due to a conflicting schedule. The proposals were considered by the Minister of Internal Affairs William Bodkin, who ultimately decided against it.

The one-term incumbent mayor Brian Hewat sought another term but was defeated for the position in a challenge from three-term Invercargill Borough Councillor Adam Adamson.

Results
The following table gives the election results:

References

1953 elections in New Zealand
Mayoral elections in Invercargill
November 1953 events in New Zealand